Television Stories (Spanish:Historias de la televisión) is a 1965 Spanish comedy film directed by José Luis Sáenz de Heredia and starring Concha Velasco, Tony Leblanc and José Luis López Vázquez. It updated the basic plot of the 1955 film Radio Stories by the same director.

Partial cast
 Concha Velasco as Katy (2) 
 Tony Leblanc as Felipe Carrasco  
 José Luis López Vázquez as Eladio (1)  
 Antonio Garisa as Don Marcelino (1,2)  
 Alfredo Landa as Antonio Parrondo y Carnicero, novio de Katy (2)  
 José Calvo as Ramón Valladares  
 José Alfayate as Faustino Carrasco  
 Manuel Alexandre as Técnico de TV (1)  
 José Luis Coll as Afrodisio Rincón, participante en concurso de TV (1)  
 Paco Morán as Agustín Cañizo, concursante escayolado (1)  
 Luchy Soto as Monja #2  
 Rafaela Aparicio as Criada de Don Marcelino (1)  
 Gracita Morales as Esposa embarazada de Eladio (1)  
 Guadalupe Muñoz Sampedro as Suegra de Eladio (1)  
 Margot Cottens as Monja recepcionista del hospital #1  
 Erasmo Pascual as Limpiabotas  
 Jesús Guzmán as Percusionista  
 José María Caffarel as Directivo de Relojes Radiant (1)

References

Bibliography 
 Bentley, Bernard. A Companion to Spanish Cinema. Boydell & Brewer 2008.

External links 
 

1965 comedy films
Spanish comedy films
1965 films
1960s Spanish-language films
Films directed by José Luis Sáenz de Heredia
Films scored by Augusto Algueró
1960s Spanish films